Granite Lake may refer to:

Granite Lake (Kawdy Plateau), a lake in British Columbia, Canada
Granite Lake (New Hampshire), a lake in Cheshire County
Granite Lake (Wisconsin), a lake in Barron County
Granite Lake (Minnesota/Ontario), an international lake
Granite Lake (Powell River), a lake in British Columbia, Canada

See also
Granite Basin Lake